Jeremiah Olugbenga Onaolapo Obadara (born 13 April 1960) is a Nigerian politician and Chairman, Lucinda Media Limited (Owners of SWEET 107.1FM), Abeokuta, Nigeria who was elected Senator for the Ogun Central constituency in Ogun State, Nigeria in the April 2011 elections. He ran on the Action Congress of Nigeria (ACN) platform.

Obadara is son of the first chairman of Odeda Local Government Area of Ogun State. He is half Yewa and half Egba.
He began work as a Grade II teacher in Ota, but later entered the telecommunications business, becoming Managing Director of Imperial Communications. His company pioneered pre-paid call cards in Nigeria and introduced electronic directories. 
In 2006, Obadara competed in the Action Congress party primaries for the 2007 senatorial elections, but did not win the nomination.

In the April 2011 elections Obadara ran for election as Senator for Ogun Central and gained 102,389 votes, defeating incumbent Senator Iyabo Obasanjo Bello of the People's Democratic Party (PDP) who scored 56,312.

References

Living people
Yoruba politicians
1960 births
People from Ogun State
Action Congress of Nigeria politicians